Celtica: Journal of the School of Celtic Studies is an academic journal devoted to Celtic studies, with particular emphasis on Irish literature, linguistics and placenames. It was established in 1946 and has since been published by the School of Celtic Studies at the Dublin Institute for Advanced Studies. Previous editors-in-chief include T.F. O'Rahilly (1946–1950) and Fergus Kelly. The latest volume (33) was edited by Barry J. Lewis and Ruairí Ó hUiginn.

Contents
 
 PDFs of vols. 20-25.

Celtic studies journals
Publications established in 1946
English-language journals